Gyrineum pulchellum, common name the tiny winged frog shell, is a species of predatory sea snail, a marine gastropod mollusk in the family Cymatiidae.

Description
The size of the shell varies between 13 mm and 35 mm.

Distribution
This marine species occurs from Indonesia to Northeast Australia.

References

External links
 Gastropods.com: Biplex pulchellum

Cymatiidae
Gastropods described in 1825